Ernst Kreidolf or Konrad Ernst Theophil Kreidolf (9 February 1863 – 12 August 1956) was a Swiss painter largely known for illustrating children's books about flower fairies.

Early life and education 
Konrad Ernst Theophil Kreidolf, the second eldest child of the Kreidolf family, was born on 9 February 1863 in Berne, Switzerland.

The family relocated to Konstanz in Germany, where his father opened a toy shop. Ernst Kreidolf was raised by his grandparents in Tägerwilen, Switzerland. In Konstanz, he began an apprenticeship as a lithographer at the Lithographische Anstalt Schmidt-Pecht (Lithographic Institute JA Pecht) while simultaneously studying drawing. Following the completion of his apprenticeship, Kreidolf kept working for Schmidt-Pecht as an assistant in order to provide for his family following the bankruptcy of his parents' shop.

In Munich, he attended the Kunstgewerbeschule. He supplemented his income by working as a lithographic draftsman. Beginning in 1885, he studied art at Paul Nauen's private art school. On his second application in 1887, the Akademie der Bildenden Künste München accepted Kreidolf as a student. He studied under Gabriel von Hackl and Ludwig von Löfftz.

Career 
He was a leading figure in the Jugendstil movement. His work as picture books demonstrates a high level of technical proficiency as well as exact botanical and zoological knowledge. Almost all of his illustrations include animals and plants given human characteristics.

Kreidolf's work often features dogs in significant or prominent roles. The Dachshund belonging to Kreidolf's friend and author Leopold Weber, whom he met in Partkirchen, served as inspiration for a large number of quite varied sketches, watercolors, paintings, and a whole illustrated book.

Death 
Kreidolf died on 12 August 1956 in Berne. He is interred in Bern's Schosshalden cemetery.

Gallery

References

19th-century Swiss painters
Swiss male painters
20th-century Swiss painters
1863 births
1956 deaths
19th-century Swiss male artists
20th-century Swiss male artists